Francisco Sampaio de Moura (born 16 August 1999) is a Portuguese professional footballer who plays as a left-back for F.C. Famalicão on loan from S.C. Braga.

Club career
Born in Braga, Moura joined S.C. Braga's youth system at the age of 12. On 28 October 2018 he made his LigaPro debut with their reserves, coming on as a 68th-minute substitute in a 2–0 away loss against U.D. Oliveirense.

In the summer of 2019, Moura was loaned to Académica de Coimbra also in the Portuguese second tier. He scored his first goal as a professional on 28 December in the 4–3 home victory over Oliveirense, but appeared in only ten competitive matches during his spell at the Estádio Cidade de Coimbra.

Moura returned to Braga's first team ahead of the 2020–21 season, under newly appointed manager Carlos Carvalhal. He played his first game in the Primeira Liga on 25 September, being replaced at half-time of the 0–1 home defeat to C.D. Santa Clara.

On 8 November 2020, playing in front of Nuno Sequeira as a left midfielder, Moura scored twice in a 3–2 win at S.L. Benfica. He missed the remainder of the campaign, however, after rupturing the cruciate ligament of his left knee in training later that month.

Moura was loaned to F.C. Famalicão for 2022–23.

International career
Moura made three late substitute appearances for Portugal at the 2018 UEFA European Under-19 Championship that the nation won in Finland, including one in the final against Italy.

References

External links

1999 births
Living people
Sportspeople from Braga
Portuguese footballers
Association football defenders
Primeira Liga players
Liga Portugal 2 players
S.C. Braga B players
Associação Académica de Coimbra – O.A.F. players
S.C. Braga players
F.C. Famalicão players
Portugal youth international footballers